Judge Myers may refer to:

Francis Kerschner Myers (1874–1940), judge of the United States District Court for the Eastern District of South Carolina
Richard E. Myers II (born 1967), judge of the United States District Court for the Eastern District of North Carolina

See also
Justice Myers (disambiguation)